Liquefaction of gases is physical conversion of a gas into a liquid state (condensation). The liquefaction of gases is a complicated process that uses various compressions and expansions to achieve high pressures and very low temperatures, using, for example, turboexpanders.

Uses
Liquefaction processes are used for scientific, industrial and commercial purposes. Many gases can be put into a liquid state at normal atmospheric pressure by simple cooling; a few, such as carbon dioxide, require pressurization as well. Liquefaction is used for analyzing the fundamental properties of gas molecules (intermolecular forces), or for the storage of gases, for example: LPG, and in refrigeration and air conditioning. There the gas is liquefied in the condenser, where the heat of vaporization is released, and evaporated in the evaporator, where the heat of vaporization is absorbed. Ammonia was the first such refrigerant, and is still in widespread use in industrial refrigeration, but it has largely been replaced by compounds derived from petroleum and halogens in residential and commercial applications.  

Liquid oxygen is provided to hospitals for conversion to gas for patients with breathing problems, and liquid nitrogen is used in the medical field for cryosurgery, by inseminators to freeze semen, and by field and lab scientists to preserve samples. Liquefied chlorine is transported for eventual solution in water, after which  it is used for water purification, sanitation of industrial waste, sewage and swimming pools, bleaching of pulp and textiles and manufacture of carbon tetrachloride, glycol and numerous other organic compounds as well as phosgene gas.

Liquefaction of helium (4He) with the precooled Hampson–Linde cycle led to a Nobel Prize for Heike Kamerlingh Onnes in 1913. Below 2.17 K liquid 4He becomes a superfluid (Nobel Prize 1978, Pyotr Kapitsa) and shows characteristic properties such as heat conduction through second sound, zero viscosity and the fountain effect among others.

The liquefaction of air is used to obtain nitrogen, oxygen, and argon and other atmospheric noble gases by separating the air components by fractional distillation in a cryogenic air separation unit.

History

Liquid air

Linde's process

Air is liquefied by the Linde process, in which air is alternately compressed, cooled, and expanded, each expansion results in a considerable reduction in temperature. With the lower temperature the molecules move more slowly and occupy less space, so the air changes phase to become liquid.

Claude's process
Air can also be liquefied by Claude's process in which the gas is allowed to expand isentropically twice in two chambers. While expanding, the gas has to do work as it is led through an expansion turbine. The gas is not yet liquid, since that would destroy the turbine. Commercial air liquefication plants bypass this problem by expanding the air at supercritical pressures. Final liquefaction takes place by isenthalpic expansion in a thermal expansion valve.

See also

 Air Liquide
 Air Products & Chemicals
 Air separation
 The BOC Group
 Chemical engineer
 Compressibility factor
 Fischer–Tropsch process
 Gas separation
 Gas to liquids
 Hampson–Linde cycle
 Industrial gases
 The Linde Group
 Liquefaction
 Liquefaction point
 Louis Paul Cailletet
 Messer Group
 Praxair
 Siemens cycle
 Turboexpander

References

External links 
Liquefaction of Gases
History of Liquefying Hydrogen - NASA

Phases of matter
Industrial processes
Gas technologies
Industrial gases

it:Condensazione